Philippe Noiret was a French film and theatre actor active from 1949 to 2006 - the year of his death.

This is his Filmography.

Filmography

Noiret, Philippe
Noiret, Philippe